Yehonatan Ya'akov "Jonathan" Mergui (born February 10, 2000), known professionally by his surname Mergui, is an Israeli singer, songwriter and dancer. He attained his fame following his participation on the fifth season of Rising Star, where he reached second place in the competition.

Biography 
Mergui was born in Tel Aviv, Israel, to a family of Moroccan-Jewish and Tunisian-Jewish descent.

In 2017–2018 he appeared on Rising Star. On the "screen level", Mergui sang the song "How Far I'll Go" from the movie Moana, which lifted the screen and won 88%. In February 2018 he qualified for the grand final of the series, he competed against Chen Aharoni, Netta Barzilai and Riki Ben Ari. At the grand final event he won 205 points, trailing at second behind Netta Barzilai – with 250 points.

On September 15, 2019, he released Ma Iyea, his debut EP produced by Johnny Goldstein. It includes the singles "Asur" and "Hakol Shakuff".

From 2018 to 2021 he was in a relationship with Israeli singer Noa Kirel.

Discography

EPs 
 Ma Iyea (2019)
Lo lihiyot levad (2021)
Dark Side of The Rainbow (2022)

References 

2000 births
Living people
Israeli pop singers
Contemporary R&B singers
Disco singers
Synth-pop singers
21st-century Israeli male singers
People from Tel Aviv